Chaudhry Asad Ur Rehman (born 2 September 1942) is a Pakistani politician who had been a member of the National Assembly of Pakistan, from 1988 to 1993, from 1997 to 1999 and again from June 2013 to May 2018.

Early life
He was born on 2 September 1942.

Political career

 He was elected to the National Assembly of Pakistan as a candidate for Islami Jamhoori Ittehad (IJI) for Constituency NA-71 (Toba Tek Singh) in the 1988 Pakistani general election. He received 65,430 votes and defeated Khalid Ahmad Khan, a candidate of the Pakistan Peoples Party (PPP).
 He was again re-elected to the National Assembly as a candidate for IJI for Constituency NA-71 (Toba Tek Singh) in the 1990 Pakistani general election. He managed to receive 65,540 votes and defeated Javed Ahmad Khan, a candidate of the Pakistan Democratic Alliance (PDA).
 He ran for the seat of the National Assembly as a candidate for Pakistan Muslim League (N) (PML-N) for Constituency NA-71 (Toba Tek Singh) in the 1993 Pakistani general election but was unsuccessful. He received 57,43 votes and lost the seat to Khalid Ahmad Khan Kharal, a candidate of PPP.
 He was re-elected to the National Assembly as a candidate for PML-N for Constituency NA-71 (Toba Tek Singh) in the 1997 Pakistani general election. He received 77,777 votes and defeated Khalid Ahmad Khan Kharal, a candidate of PPP.
 He served as federal minister of state.
 He ran for the seat of the National Assembly as a candidate of PML-N from Constituency NA-94 (Toba Tek Singh-III) in the 2002 Pakistani general election, but was unsuccessful. He received 44,942 votes and lost the seat to Riaz Fatyana.
 He ran for the seat of the National Assembly as a candidate of PML-N from Constituency NA-94 (Toba Tek Singh-III) in the 2008 Pakistani general election, but was unsuccessful. He received 59,284 votes and lost the seat to Riaz Fatyana.candidate of PML-N from Constituency NA-94 (Toba Tek Singh-III) in 2013 Pakistani general election. He received 103,581 votes and defeated Riaz Fatyana.

References

Living people
Pakistan Muslim League (N) politicians
Punjabi people
Pakistani MNAs 2013–2018
1942 births
Pakistani MNAs 1988–1990
Pakistani MNAs 1990–1993
Pakistani MNAs 1997–1999